Edathara is a village in Parli Panchayat, Palakkad district, Kerala, India.

References 

Villages in Palakkad district